Kentucky Route 118 (KY 118), also known as the Hyden Spur and the Tim Couch Pass, is a 3.524 mile (5.671 km) long state highway in southeastern Kentucky, running entirely in Leslie County. The route originates at exit 44 of the Hal Rogers Parkway near the unincorporated community of Thousandsticks, and connects with US 421 in the county seat of Hyden.

Route description
The road, a modern two-lane road with an extra climbing lane where necessary, was originally the Hyden Spur of the Daniel Boone Parkway (now the Hal Rogers Parkway). Shortly after exiting the parkway, the road climbs a large hill for roughly a mile (1.6 km). The last mile into Hyden is a 7% downhill grade, with a runaway truck ramp near its end at US 421.

The road is also known as Tim Couch Pass, after the former University of Kentucky and NFL quarterback, who is a Hyden native.

Major intersections

References

External links
 

0118
Leslie County, Kentucky